Miss Korea 2009 was a beauty pageant that was held on July 8, 2009 at the Sejong Center, sponsored by the Korean newspaper HanKook Daily News. Approximately 56 women from around the world competed in Seoul, South Korea and seven, equivalent to semi-finalists  were selected by a panel of judges. The 1st-place winner, Kim Joo-ri, was crowned the official Miss Korea and later competed in Miss World 2009 and Miss Universe 2010. Additionally, there were two sun (선) finalists, known as the 1st and 2nd runners-up respectively. The 1st Runner Up competed in Miss International 2009 and the 2nd Runner Up competed in Miss Earth 2009.

Results

Placements

List of Contestants

References

External links
 Miss Korea's Official Website
 Miss Korea 2009 Contestants

2009
2009 in South Korea
2009 beauty pageants